Winchester is a city in White River Township, Randolph County, in the U.S. state of Indiana. The population was 4,935 at the 2010 census. The city is the county seat of Randolph County. It is the home of Winchester Speedway.

History
Winchester was laid out in 1818 as the county seat. A post office has been in operation at Winchester since 1820.

The Gen. Asahel Stone Mansion, Winchester Courthouse Square Historic District, and Winchester Residential Historic District are listed on the National Register of Historic Places.

Geography
Winchester is located at  (40.173165, -84.977435).

Demographics

2010 census
At the 2010 census there were 4,935 people, 2,051 households, and 1,281 families living in the city. The racial makeup of the city was 96.1% White, 0.5% African American, 0.5% Native American, 0.5% Asian, 1.3% from other races, and 1.1% from two or more races. Hispanic or Latino of any race were 2.6%.

Of the 2,051 households 30.2% had children under the age of 18 living with them, 43.1% were married couples living together, 14.3% had a female householder with no husband present, 5.0% had a male householder with no wife present, and 37.5% were non-families. 32.2% of households were one person and 14.9% were one person aged 65 or older. The average household size was 2.32 and the average family size was 2.89.

The median age was 40.2 years. 23.6% of residents were under the age of 18; 8.3% were between the ages of 18 and 24; 23.8% were from 25 to 44; 25.4% were from 45 to 64; and 18.9% were 65 or older. The gender makeup of the city was 47.6% male and 52.4% female.

2000 census
At the 2000 census there were 5,037 people, 2,171 households, and 1,350 families living in the city. The racial makeup of the city was 98.31% White, 0.24% African American, 0.26% Native American, 0.30% Asian, 0.32% from other races, and 0.58% from two or more races. Hispanic or Latino of any race were 1.41%.

Of the 2,171 households 27.4% had children under the age of 18 living with them, 48.1% were married couples living together, 10.5% had a female householder with no husband present, and 37.8% were non-families. 33.7% of households were one person, and 16.2% were one person aged 65 or older. The average household size was 2.23 and the average family size was 2.83.

In the city the population was spread out, with 22.2% under the age of 18, 8.9% from 18 to 24, 27.4% from 25 to 44, 22.0% from 45 to 64, and 19.6% 65 or older. The median age was 40 years. For every 100 females, there were 88.7 males. For every 100 females age 18 and over, there were 84.9 males.

The median household income was $28,500 and the median family income  was $37,607. Males had a median income of $28,947 versus $22,226 for females. The per capita income for the city was $17,753. About 10.9% of families and 15.0% of the population were below the poverty line, including 20.2% of those under age 18 and 6.9% of those age 65 or over.

Education
The town has a lending library, the Winchester Community Public Library.

Willard Elementary School

Notable people
 James P. Goodrich, Governor of Indiana, 1917–1921, born in Winchester 
 Randy Jo Hobbs, musician born in Winchester
 James Eli Watson, U. S. Senator
 Robert Wise, Hollywood director, born in Winchester
 Greg Leffler, Indy car driver
 Troy Puckett, pitcher for the Philadelphia Phillies in 1911, born in Winchester 
 I. Marlene King, creator of the ABC Family original series Pretty Little Liars

References

External links
 City of Winchester, Indiana website

 
Cities in Indiana
Cities in Randolph County, Indiana
County seats in Indiana